The Chosen Ones – Greatest Hits is the first greatest hits album by Australian blues and roots band, The Black Sorrows. It includes tracks from all but one of their seven studio albums to date. There are no tracks from Rockin' Zydeco (1985).

The album debuted at number 28 on the ARIA Charts and peaked at number 4 in January 1994. The album was certified platinum.

The album was re-released on CD in August 2016 as part of Sony Music Australia's 'Gold Series'.

Track listing
 CD/ Cassette (Columbia Records – 4748632)

Charts

Weekly charts

Year-end charts

Certifications

Release history

References

External links
 "The Chosen Ones" at discogs.com

The Black Sorrows albums
Compilation albums by Australian artists
1993 compilation albums
Columbia Records albums
Albums produced by Joe Camilleri